The Centaurus is a mixed use real estate development in the city of Islamabad, Pakistan. The project includes a 36-floor hotel, three 23-floor residential and office towers and a four-story shopping mall. It has Al Fateh Cash & Carry on ground floor and food courts on top floor.

Construction 
Designed by British architectural firm WS Atkins, it consists of a four-storey shopping mall, a five-star hotel, two residential towers, and a corporate tower three skyscrapers, containing corporate offices, residential apartments, and a hotel. Centaurus Mövenpick Hotel is under-construction and was expected to open in the first quarter of 2018.

The estimated cost for building the complex was US$100 million. The Centaurus Mall has four stories and comprises more than 250 shops.

Entertainment 
The Centaurus Mall also includes entertainment in the form of a play area for children, known as "Fun City", and a movie theatre known as "The Centaurus Cineplex", which shows some of the latest Lollywood and Hollywood movies. Both the play area and the cinema are located on the fourth floor of the mall.

Food court 
The food court is located on the fourth floor of the mall, and comprises several local as well as international fast food chains. International coffee shops are also located throughout the mall.

Entry fee controversy
In what it called a move to avoid ‘over-crowding’, Centaurus Mall in a public notice said visitors will have to buy a coupon to enter the mall, which is adjustable against shopping at the mall on the same day. The public notice listed 23 types of people who will not have to purchase the entry coupons. Those exempted include all women and children under 12, senior citizens, lawmakers and executives, diplomats and foreigners, journalists, and lawyers, members of country clubs, registered engineers, doctors, and teachers. Further, the notice said, “famous players of hockey, cricket, football and golf” and “celebrities” do not have to purchase the entry coupon.

October 2022 fire
The shopping center at the Centaurus Mall caught fire on October 9, 2022. The fire was visible from outside the building during lunch time, while reports on social media also showed visible flame in the food court of the mall. The Capital Development Authority claimed the fire to be under control after two hours of response. The shopping center and nearby residential structures were closed for an audit to be made on their structural integrity.

The fire broke out in the Monal restaurant and was reported around 4 pm. The efforts of firefighters extinguished the fire preventing extensive damage to the interior. Navy and Air Force personnel also took part to cooling the building.

See also
 List of tallest buildings in Islamabad

References

External links

 

Shopping malls in Pakistan
Hotels in Pakistan
Apartment buildings in Pakistan
Residential skyscrapers in Pakistan
Skyscrapers in Islamabad
Blue Area
Shopping malls in Islamabad